Makowice may refer to the following places in Poland:
Makowice, Lower Silesian Voivodeship (south-west Poland)
Makowice, Opole Voivodeship (south-west Poland)
Makowice, West Pomeranian Voivodeship (north-west Poland)